Sanyang Motor Co., Ltd. (stylized as SYM) is a Taiwanese motorcycle manufacturer headquartered in Hukou, Taiwan. Founded in Taipei, Taiwan in 1954 by Huang Chi-Chun and Chang Kuo An, SYM currently has three major production facilities in Taiwan, mainland China, and Vietnam. SYM manufactures and sells scooters, motorcycles and ATVs under the Sanyang Motor [SYM] brand, while it also manufactures automobiles and mini-trucks under the Hyundai brand.

History
In 1954  Sanyang Electrics was formed to manufacture dynamoelectric light sets for bicycles.  It was restructured into Sanyang Industry Co. Ltd. and entered a technical agreement with Honda in 1961 to begin local assembly of motorcycles, the first motorcycle manufacturer in Taiwan (30% local content). In 1969 assembly of small Honda cars (N600, TN360) began. As Sanyang's own motorcycles entered direct competition with Honda's products worldwide, the relationship was terminated in January 2002 and Honda began building cars themselves as Honda Taiwan Co. Ltd. Sanyang instead signed a contract with Hyundai and currently assembles much of their lineup for the domestic Taiwanese market.

Sanyang Industry was renamed as Sanyang Motor Co. Ltd. in January, 2015.  The Company has its main office in the Hsinchu Industrial Park in Hsinchu County, Taiwan. It has a subsidiary in Xiamen city, China, named Xiamen Xiashing Motorcycle Co., Ltd., and another subsidiary in Bien Hoa, Dong Nai, Vietnam, named Vietnam Manufacturing & Export Processing Co., Ltd. (VMEP).

Global operations
Sanyang is a strategic partner of the Hyundai Motor Company since 2002. Its subsidiary company Nan Yang Industries Co., Ltd. operates as sole distributor for Hyundai and manufactures Hyundai automobiles and mini-trucks in Taiwan. Sanyang also has ties with international companies like International Truck, Bombardier Recreational Products and Mahindra & Mahindra Limited in India.

In July 2005, Sanyang launched a new range of two-wheelers for sale in the European market. The range includes the GTS scooter (available with 125 cc, 200 cc and 250 cc engines), the MIO scooter (50 cc and 100 cc), and two ATV models: the Trackrunner leisure ATV (200 cc engine), and the 250 cc Quadlander off-roader.

In January 2006, Sanyang signed an agreement with the Kinetic Motor Company of India for a purchase of 2,065,000 equity shares and technical collaboration, which will amount to Sanyang holding an 11.1% (approx.) stake of the enhanced capital of Kinetic Motor Company Limited.  With Sanyang taking a minority stake, the management control will be retained with the Kinetic Group. In 2008, the two-wheeler division of The Kinetic Group was taken over by Mahindra, a leading manufacturer of utility vehicles in India.

In 2002, SYM scooters began appearing in the US courtesy of a grey market importer SYM USA from West Palm Beach, Florida.  Several hundred units were imported from the UK that were non-EPA, non-DOT certified and a rogue US distribution network developed.

In 2003 an official importer, SYM America, organized by the Malaguti USA importer, began operations selling in the Southeast and Puerto Rico. In 2004 Tomos USA negotiated with Sanyang for exclusive sales in the US, but the deal was called off later due to some disagreement on contact details. Sanyang later cooperated with Carter Brothers Mfg. Co. Inc for its sales in the US.  Malaguti USA ceased and became Martin Racing Performance and still carried some parts for the DD 50 and Jet Euro 50. In an agreement reached with Carter Brothers Mfg. Co. Inc. the company abandoned the SYM scooter distribution project for the US in exchange for assistance in developing the after-market go kart product and stocking the SYM upgrade lines for Carter Brothers Mfg. Co. Inc.

In January 2006, SYM signed a partnership agreement with Carter Brothers Mfg. Co. Inc. for exclusive distribution rights in the United States of America. Established in 1936 by the brothers W.W. Carter and Charlie Carter, the company initially specialized in manufacturing agricultural machinery, lawnmowers and personal gardening equipment.

On 12 July 2010, a fire destroyed Carter Brother's main warehouse and manufacturing facility, resulting in the loss of approximately 3,000 unsold SYM scooters. A subsequent investigation by the Alabama State Fire Marshal's Office determined that the cause of the fire was arson.

In March 2011, an official at Carter Brothers Mfg. Co. Inc. made it known to the editor of the Team Symba web blog that the partnership agreement between SYM and Carter Brothers would end as of 1 April 2011. Also in March 2011, Alliance Powersports, Inc. (a subsidiary of Lance Powersports, Inc.) of Mira Loma, California, notified existing SYM dealers that it had signed an exclusive distribution agreement with SYM for the western half of the US.

In October 2006, SYM opened a second manufacturing facility in Nagoya, Japan. They are known for their parody advertisements on Japanese subways, taxis and cars. Their slogan, reading "名古屋にこいや!", literally meaning "Come down to Nagoya!", is known by many locals.

In July 2014, Walter H. C. Chang was appointed Chairman of Sanyang Motor.  He has been taking actions to further strengthen the company's core businesses, optimize sales channels and increase customers' satisfaction.

Models

Scooters
The company has offered, or now offers, the following scooter models:
Allo 50 
Allo 125
Attila
Crox
Cello
Citycom 125
Citycom 300i
Cruisym 125
DD 50 (SYM Jolie)
Duke
Euro MX
Fancy 50
Fiddle
Fiddle II

Fiddle III
Flash 50
Free 50
GR125
GT125
GTS250i
GT125 EVO
GTS 200
GTS (called Joymax in Israel)
GTS EVO 125i
GTS 1
HD 200
Jet
Jet 4
Jet Euro X
JetPower
JetPower EVO
Jet S
Jet Sport X
 Joymax 300i
Joyride (called Le Grande in Australia)
Jungle
Lance Cabo 50/100/150 cc
Lance Cali Classic 50/125/150/169 cc (the 169 cc is fuel injected, and marketed as a 200i)
Lance Havana Classic 50/125/150/169 cc (the 169 cc is fuel injected, and marketed as a 200i)
Lance PCH 50/125/150 cc
Lance Soho 50
Mask
MaxSym 400i/600i
Megalo
Mio 50 (Models: Race, 50th Anniversary, Deluxe [Europe])
Mio 100
Orbit/Classic
PCH 50/125/150/169 cc (the 169 cc is fuel injected, and marketed as a 200i)
Pure 
Pure SR ("Super Race" Version of Pure/Flash 50)
Symply
Radar-X (Also called Radar 125 in Thailand)
Red Devil (also a Michael Schumacher Version available)
RS
RV250
Super Duke
Super Fancy 50
Shark
VS/Excel II
Fighter (carbureted, ZR dual disc version and EFI VIP)
New Fighter (EFI with STCS intake technology)
Xpro series
SYM Joyride 125 Evo
Symphony
Symphony 125S
Symphony SR
Symphony ST (Also called Fancy 125 in Vietnam)
Symmetry
Z1

Motorcycles
SYM 250
Bonus MB125A
Wolf 125/150/300
Wolf Classic 125/150
T1 150
T2 250
T3 280
RV 1-2
XS125-K
Wolf SB 250NI
Husky 125

SYM 183
NHT 190/200 (Trazer)

SYM 125
 NHT 125

Cubs
VF3i 185 / Star SR 170
Sport Rider / StarX 125i
Bonus 100
Bonus 110
Magic 110RR
RV1
Symba

ATVs
Outback 700
Track Runner
QuadLander
Quadraider 600cc

Light Trucks and Vans
 T880/T1000/V5/V9/V11
 2.0T

See also
 Kymco
 List of companies of Taiwan
 List of Taiwanese automakers
 Automotive industry in Taiwan

References
Notes

Sources

External links

SYM Motors
SanYang Motor
SYM Motors Bike Models

Companies listed on the Taiwan Stock Exchange
Electric scooters
Scooter manufacturers
Taiwanese brands
Motorcycle manufacturers of Taiwan
Motorcycles by brand
Vehicle manufacturing companies established in 1954
Multinational companies headquartered in Taiwan
1954 establishments in Taiwan